Aleandro is both a surname and a given name. Notable people with the name include:

Girolamo Aleandro (1480–1542), Italian cardinal
Girolamo Aleandro, the younger (1594–1629), Italian scholar
Norma Aleandro (born 1936), Argentine actress, screenwriter and theatre director
Pedro Aleandro (1910–1985), Argentine actor
Aleandro Baldi (born 1959), Italian singer-songwriter and composer
Aleandro Rosi (born 1987), Italian footballer